Teenage Exorcist is a 1991 American comedy horror film directed by Grant Austin Waldman and written by Brinke Stevens from a story by Fred Olen Ray. The film stars Stevens, Eddie Deezen, and Robert Quarry. Though the film was shot in 1991, Teenage Exorcist was not released on video until 1994.

Plot synopsis
Diane (Brinke Stevens), a prim and proper grad student, rents a spooky old house from a creepy realtor (Michael Berryman). Unfortunately for Diane, an ancient demon (Oliver Darrow) resides in her basement. She's soon possessed by the spirits of the house, turning her into a leather-clad, chainsaw-wielding succubus. When Diane's sister Sally (Elena Sahagun), Sally's brother-in-law Mike (Jay Richardson) and Diane's boyfriend Jeff (Tom Shell) come to visit only to be attacked by her demonic incarnation, they summon a priest, Father McFerrin (Robert Quarry), to handle the situation. Failing that, Father McFerrin attempts to call an exorcist, only to dial the wrong number and unwittingly place an order at the local pizza parlor. When the pizza delivery boy (Eddie Deezen) arrives at the house, it's up to him and the rest of the gang to destroy the demon and stop his nefarious scheme.

Cast
 Brinke Stevens as Diane
 Eddie Deezen as Eddie
 Oliver Darrow as The Demon
 Jay Richardson as Mike
 Tom Shell as Jeff
 Elena Sahagun as Sally
 Robert Quarry as Father McFerrin
 Kathryn Kates as Maid
 Michael Berryman as Herman

Reception
Critical reception to Teenage Exorcist was primarily negative, though it has received mixed praise from cult film audiences. Legendary film critic Joe Bob Briggs, though giving the film only 1 star, was amused by the film's low-brow humor and Brinke Stevens' revealing costumes, awarding it with his catchphrase "Joe Bob says check it out". Allmovie gave the movie a rating of two stars out of five without a written review.

External links

References

1991 films
1994 films
1990s comedy horror films
American comedy horror films
American haunted house films
Films about exorcism
Demons in film
1991 comedy films
1994 comedy films
1990s English-language films
1990s American films